David Barmby Burke  (14 October 1916 – 4 January 1987) was an Australian rules footballer who played with North Melbourne in the Victorian Football League (VFL).

Personal life
Burke served as a lieutenant in the Second Australian Imperial Force during the Second World War. He was awarded the Military Cross for actions in the South Pacific in November 1943.

Notes

External links

1916 births
1987 deaths
Australian rules footballers from Victoria (Australia)
North Melbourne Football Club players
Australian Army personnel of World War II
Australian Army officers
Australian recipients of the Military Cross
Australian rules footballers from Tasmania